The 1902 Harvard Crimson football team represented Harvard University in the 1902 college football season. The Crimson finished with an 11–1 record under first-year head coach John Wells Farley.  The 1902 team won its first eleven games by a combined 184–23 score.  It then closed the season with a 23–0 loss against rival Yale.  Walter Camp selected two Harvard players as first-team selections to his 1902 College Football All-America Team. They were end Edward Bowditch and fullback Thomas Graydon.

Schedule

References

Harvard
Harvard Crimson football seasons
Harvard Crimson football
1900s in Boston